Mean Frank and Crazy Tony ( or ) is a 1973 crime-comedy film directed by Michele Lupo, and starring Lee Van Cleef, Tony Lo Bianco and Edwige Fenech.

Plot
Tony Breda, whilst well-respected in his Italian town, is a small-time criminal who idolises and attempts to imitate his hero Italo-American mobster Frankie Diomede who has earned the nickname "Dio" ("God"). Tony reads in the newspaper that Frank has returned to Genoa to take care of a rival organisation, run by Louis Annunziata, operating in his home territory. Starstruck, Tony follows Frank from his hotel to a villa where a party is taking place and tries to gain entry. Frank calmly calls the police and alerts them to illegal gambling activities taking place at the party, and in doing so arranges his own arrest. When Tony hears advancing police sirens, he pushes past the fleeing guests to reach Frank, believing that if he rescues him from arrest, he will be "made for life". Frank refuses to leave with Tony and both are arrested.

While in prison, with the help of a guard that has presumably been paid by Frank, Frank leaves the premises by cover of night to murder a rival. On returning he is seen by Tony. Annunziata alerts the police to the murder, and they seek to hold Frank indefinitely whilst they investigate. Meanwhile, Tony is advised that he will spend a couple of weeks in prison on minor charges. Tony tries to befriend Frank with flattery and imitation, which Frank largely ignores. However, Tony spots an assassin with a sniper rifle on the roof of the prison and pushes Frank out of the way, saving his life. Frank softens toward Tony, who declares that he would do anything for Frank.

Frank asks his estranged brother who is a respectable doctor to visit him, and asks him to collect files containing identifying information on his rival's organisation and hand them in to the police. His brother agrees, but is followed, pulled into a photo booth and murdered. A gang member uses the booth to take a photo of Frank's dead brother. Tony convinces Frank that he can arrange a break-out during Frank's transfer to another prison, which he successfully achieves by staging a car crash and waving down the police car transferring Frank. The two then embark on a deadly police car chase in a truck carrying oil drums and cross the border into Marseilles. Frank tracks down his rival at a fish fish processing warehouse, where Annunziata's runs an operation concealing heroin inside gutted fish to be exported to the United States. A violent shoot out takes place in which Tony proves himself to be useful, though he becomes paralysed with distress when he shoots a man, having never taken a life before, a man who he believes he has killed. Frank reassures Tony that he did not kill the man and that Frank actually delivered the fatal bullet.

Frank forces Annunziata at gun point into a cold storage room, where he adjusts the temperature to its lowest setting, causing Annunziata to freeze to death. Frank arranges a boat to Tunisia, via an old friend, but informs Tony that a life of hard crime is not for him, and urges him to reform his ways. Tony accepts that he is not cut out for such violence and returns home. When he greets his friends they read an excerpt from the newspaper which describes Frank in an unfavorable way, and Tony advises his friend to lead an honest life.

Cast 
 Lee Van Cleef: Frankie Diomede
 Tony Lo Bianco: Tony Breda
 Edwige Fenech: Orchidea
 Jean Rochefort: Louis Annunziata
 Fausto Tozzi: Massara
 Silvano Tranquilli: Silvestro
 Adolfo Lastretti: Al
 Claudio Gora: Director of 'Casa del Giovane' 
 Jess Hahn: Jeannot
 Mario Erpichini: Joe Sciti
 Nello Pazzafini: Thug in Prison
 Robert Hundar: Assassin   
 Renzo Marignano: Receiver

Release
Mean Frank and Crazy Tony was released in Italy on 23 November 1973 where it was distributed by Ceiad. It grossed a total 353,735,000 Italian lire domestically. It was released in Paris on 7 March 1975 as L'homme aux nerfs d'acier.

Notes

References

External links

1973 films
1970s buddy comedy films
Italian buddy comedy films
Films about organized crime in Italy
Films directed by Michele Lupo
Films set on the French Riviera
Films set in Genoa
Films set in Marseille
Italian gangster films
Italian crime comedy films
Italian prison films
Films scored by Riz Ortolani
Films produced by Dino De Laurentiis
1970s crime comedy films
English-language French films
English-language Italian films
1973 comedy films
Films with screenplays by Sergio Donati
Films with screenplays by Luciano Vincenzoni
1970s Italian films